"Young Like Us" is a song by Swedish singer Frans. It was released as a digital download and on streaming sites on 24 June 2016 through Cardiac Records. The song debuted and peaked at number 89 on the Swedish Singles Chart.

Track listing

Chart performance

Weekly charts

Release date

References

2016 songs
2016 singles
English-language Swedish songs
Frans Jeppsson-Wall songs